Debra Paget (born Debralee Griffin; August 19, 1933) is an American actress and entertainer. She is perhaps best known for her performances in Cecil B. DeMille's epic The Ten Commandments (1956) and in Elvis Presley's film debut, Love Me Tender (1956), as well as for the risqué (for the time) snake dance scene in The Indian Tomb (1959).

Early life
Paget was born in Denver, Colorado, one of five children born to Margaret Allen (née Gibson), a former actress (one source says, "ex-burlesque queen"), and Frank Henry Griffin, a painter. The family moved from Denver to Los Angeles, California, in the 1930s to be close to the developing film industry. Paget was enrolled in the Hollywood Professional School when she was 11. Margaret was determined that Debra and her siblings would also make their careers in show business. Three of Paget's siblings, Marcia (Teala Loring), Leslie (Lisa Gaye), and Frank (Ruell Shayne), entered show business.

Paget had her first professional job at age 8, and acquired some stage experience at 13 when she acted in a 1946 production of Shakespeare's The Merry Wives of Windsor.

Career

20th Century Fox

Paget's first notable film role was as Teena Riconti, girlfriend of the character played by Richard Conte, in Cry of the City, a 1948 film noir directed by Robert Siodmak for 20th Century Fox.

Fox liked her and signed her to a long-term contract. She had small roles in Mother Is a Freshman (1949), It Happens Every Spring (1949) and House of Strangers (1949).

Broken Arrow
Her first vehicle for Fox was the successful Broken Arrow with James Stewart. At the age of 16, Paget played a Native American maiden, Sonseeahray ("morningstar"), who falls in love with Stewart's character. Stewart was 42 at the time.

From 1950 to 1956, she took part in six original radio plays for Family Theater. During those same years, she read parts in four episodes of Lux Radio Theater, sharing the microphone with such actors as Burt Lancaster, Tyrone Power, Cesar Romero, Ronald Colman, and Robert Stack. The latter set included dramatizations of two of her feature films.

Paget had a sizable role in Fourteen Hours (1951) and was reunited with Broken Arrow director Delmer Daves and star Jeff Chandler in Bird of Paradise (1951), playing a role similar to Broken Arrow.

Paget was the second female lead in Anne of the Indies (1951). She was third billed in Belles on Their Toes (1952) and second billed in Les Misérables (1952), playing Cosette.

Paget was Robert Wagner's love interest in Stars and Stripes Forever (1952) and Prince Valiant (1954). In 1953, wearing a blonde wig, she auditioned along with Anita Ekberg and Irish McCalla, among others, for the starring role in Sheena, Queen of the Jungle, which went to McCalla.

Princess of the Nile
Fox finally gave Paget top billing with the swashbuckler Princess of the Nile (1954), co-starring Jeffrey Hunter. The film was not a notable success at the box office. However, during the year after Princess of the Nile was released, the fan mail Paget received at 20th Century-Fox was topped only by that for Marilyn Monroe and Betty Grable.

Paget had a substantial supporting role in Demetrius and the Gladiators (1954), a massive commercial success. She was Dale Robertson's love interest in The Gambler from Natchez (1954) and played another Native American in White Feather (1955), playing the sister of Jeffrey Hunter's character, and lover of Robert Wagner's character.

Fox loaned Paget and Hunter to Allied Artists to appear in Seven Angry Men (1955). At MGM, when Anne Bancroft was injured during filming The Last Hunt (1956), the studio borrowed Paget to play her role, another Native American.

The Ten Commandments

Paramount Pictures borrowed her from 20th Century Fox for the part of Lilia, the water girl, in Cecil B. DeMille's biblical epic The Ten Commandments (1956), her most successful film. She had to wear brown contact lenses to hide her blue eyes; she said that "If it hadn't been for the lenses I wouldn't have gotten the part". However, she also said that the lenses were "awful to work in because the klieg lights heat[ed] them up".

The film was a huge success, as was Paget's Fox western, Love Me Tender (1956) alongside Elvis Presley; Paget and Richard Egan were billed above Presley, but it was the singer's popularity and charisma that made the film so successful.

The River's Edge (1957) was the last film she made for Fox.

Post-Fox
After that, Paget's career began to decline. She went to Paramount to play Cornel Wilde's love interest in Omar Khayyam (1957). She was the juvenile lead in From the Earth to the Moon (1958). A talented dancer and singer, Paget also had a successful nightclub act at the Flamingo Hotel in Las Vegas.

Europe
In 1958, she traveled to Germany to headline the cast of Fritz Lang's two-film adventure saga, The Tiger of Eschnapur and The Indian Tomb (1959), a role that recalled her character in of Princess of the Nile.

In 1959, Paget appeared as Lela Russell in the episode "The Unwilling" of the NBC Western television series, Riverboat, starring Darren McGavin. In the story line, Dan Simpson, played by Eddie Albert, attempts to open a general store despite a raid from pirates who stole $20,000 in merchandise. Russell Johnson appears in this episode as Darius. In 1959 she played a Mexican revolutionary in an episode of Wagon Train

In 1960, she appeared as Laura Ashley in the episode "Incident of the Garden of Eden" on CBS's Western series, Rawhide. That same year, she had played an author, Agnes St. John, the only surviving witness to a brutal stagecoach robbery in another CBS Western, Johnny Ringo, starring Don Durant in the title role. In 1962, she returned to Rawhide to play the part of Azuela in the episode "Hostage Child" along with James Coburn.

Paget appeared in Cleopatra's Daughter (1960) shot in Italy, Why Must I Die? (1960) for American International Pictures, Most Dangerous Man Alive (1961), and Rome 1585 (1961) again in Italy.

AIP
Her final two films were for Roger Corman at American International Pictures: Tales of Terror (1963) and The Haunted Palace (1963).

She did television work throughout her career. Her last performance in this medium came in a December 1965 episode of ABC's Burke's Law, starring Gene Barry. She retired from entertainment in 1965, after marrying a wealthy oil executive, by whom she had one son, her only child.

Later career
Paget became a born-again Christian. She hosted her own show, An Interlude with Debra Paget, on the Trinity Broadcasting Network (TBN), a Christian network, in the early 1990s, and also was involved in Praise the Lord. She occasionally appears on TBN as a guest.

In 1987, the Motion Picture and Television Fund presented Paget with its Golden Boot Award, which is awarded to those actors, writers, directors, and stunt crew who "have contributed so much to the development and preservation of the western tradition in film and television."

Independent filmmaker Mark Rappaport paid tribute to her in his 2016 documentary essay, Debra Paget, For Example.

Personal life

During production of Love Me Tender (1956), Elvis Presley became smitten with Paget, who in 1997 said that he had proposed marriage. At the time, however, the media reported that she was romantically linked with Howard Hughes and nothing came of this infatuation. A 1956 article quoted Paget's comments about Hughes:
I was in love with Howard for two years, and I don't care who knows it... I was never alone with him in the whole two years. Mother was always with us... I haven't seen Howard for a long time now, because I'm a one-man woman, and I've got to have a one-woman man... But I'll always remember Howard with fondness.

Paget married actor and singer David Street on January 14, 1958, but she obtained a divorce on April 11, 1958.

On March 27, 1960, she married Budd Boetticher, a director, in Tijuana, Mexico. They separated after 22 days, and their divorce became official in 1961.

Paget left the entertainment industry in 1964 after marrying Ling C. Kung (孔令傑) on April 19, 1962. Kung was a Chinese-American oil industry executive. His parents were banker and politician H. H. Kung and businesswoman Soong Ai-ling. Through his father, he was a descendant of Confucius. His maternal aunts were Soong Mei-ling, wife of Chiang Kai-shek and First Lady of the Republic of China, and political figure Soong Ching-ling. Paget and Kung had one son, Gregory Teh-chi Kung. Their marriage ended in divorce in 1980.

Filmography

Feature films

Radio plays

Family Theater
 1950-11-29 "The Clown" – Debra Paget, Stephen Dunn
 1952-01-23 "The Thinking Machine" – Donald O'Connor, Debra Paget
 1953-02-11 "The Indispensable Man" – Lisa Gaye, Robert Stack, Debra Paget
 1953-12-09 "The Legend of High Chin Bob" – Debra Paget, Walter Brennan
 1955-07-27 "Fairy Tale" – Debra Paget, Jack Haley
 1956-11-07 "Integrity" – Debra Paget, Cesar Romero

Lux Radio Theatre
1951-01-22 "Broken Arrow" – Burt Lancaster, Debra Paget
1952-09-22 "I'll Never Forget You" – Tyrone Power, Debra Paget, Michael Pate
1952-12-22 "Les Misérables" – Ronald Colman, Debra Paget, Robert Newton
1953-04-20 "Deadline USA" – Dan Dailey, Debra Paget, William Conrad

Stars over Hollywood
1953-02-21 "The Wonderful Miss Prinn" – Debra Paget

References

Further reading

External links

 dancing with a cobra in The Indian Tomb

1933 births
Living people
20th-century American actresses
20th Century Studios contract players
Actresses from Denver
Actresses from Los Angeles
American Christians
American film actresses
American radio actresses
American television actresses
Western (genre) film actresses